Roger Lévêque (5 December 1920 in Saint-Nazaire – 30 June 2002 in Saint-Avertin) was a professional French road racing cyclist from 1946 to 1953. His only victory was the 4th stage of the 1951 Tour de France, and in the same Tour he wore the yellow jersey for 6 days.

Tour de France results

1947 Tour de France
24th place
1948 Tour de France
did not finish
1949 Tour de France
31st place
1951 Tour de France
30th place
Winner of 4th stage
Wearing the yellow jersey for 6 days

External links 

Official Tour de France results for Roger Lévêque

Sportspeople from Saint-Nazaire
French male cyclists
French Tour de France stage winners
1920 births
2002 deaths
Cyclists from Loire-Atlantique